Lacuesta is a surname. Notable people with the surname include:

Angelo Rodriguez Lacuesta, Filipino writer
Félix Lacuesta (born 1958), French footballer
Isaki Lacuesta (born 1975), Catalan film director